Mondobiotech was a Swiss-based biotechnology company focused on developing human peptides as medicaments for patients affected by rare diseases.

History
Mondobiotech was founded in 2000 by Fabio Cavalli and Dorian Bevec. The company listed on the Zurich exchange in 2009. In March 2012, ''Pharma Times'in exclusive negotiations with Pierrel Research, the contact research division of the Italian company Pierrel.

Research and development
Mondobiotech created drugs for rare diseases.

Achievements
Winner of the Swiss Life Sciences Prize 2005.
Selected Technology Pioneer 2008 by The World Economic Forum.

Notes and references

See also 
 List of pharmaceutical companies
 Pharmaceutical industry in Switzerland

Pharmaceutical companies of Switzerland